The Everard Sharrock Jr. Farm (also known as Sharrock–Niblo Farmstead) is a historic farm at 6900 Grady Niblo Road in Dallas, Texas. It contains possibly the oldest surviving buildings in the city.  The farm was added to the National Register of Historic Places in 2015 as #15000877.  The farm is also a Texas Historic Landmark. Everard Sharrock Jr. built the log cabin house on his 640 acre farm, and building's history is documented from the time of the Peters Colony settlement.  The log cain and barn date from 1847 and the frame farm house likely dates from the late 1800s and the barn from the 1920s to 1930s. The Young family acquired the property from Sharrock in 1853 and they sold the property in 1934 to the Niblo family. The City of Dallas acquired the property in the early 21st century to preserve the original farm buildings."Sharrock/Niblo Farmstead" https://dallascityhall.com/departments/sustainabledevelopment/historicpreservation/Pages/sharrock-niblo.aspx

References

See also
List of the oldest buildings in Texas

Museums in Dallas
National Register of Historic Places in Dallas
Houses completed in 1847